Betsey was launched at Pool in 1801. She made two voyages as a slave ship. French privateers captured her on the second voyage but the British Royal Navy recaptured her. Afterwards she was briefly a West Indiaman. She was wrecked in February 1807.

Career
1st slave voyage (1802–1803): Captain John McLean (or McLain) sailed from London on 24 February 1802. Betsey arrived at Kingston, Jamaica on 27 September 1802 with 273 slaves. She arrived back at London on 3 February 1803.

2nd slave voyage (1804): Captain James MacDonald acquired a letter of marque on 5 July 1804. Ten days later he sailed for the Gold Coast.

On 22 February 1805 Betsey, M'Donald, master, was off Surinam when the French privateer Eagle captured her.  recaptured Betsey.

By another account, Betsey joined up with Somerset, Neil, master, and Jason, Martin, master, on 20 February some 40 miles off the Surinam river. Somerset and Jason had sailed together from Madeira for mutual protection. Shortly after the came together, two French privateers came up, Fillebutiere, of fourteen 6 and 9-pounder guns and 100 men, and Aigle, of sixteen 9 and 12-pounder guns and 160 men. After an action of about an hour and a half, Betsey struck to Fillebutiere and Jason and Somerset struck to Aigle. While they were on their way, they encountered Beaulieu which recaptured Betsey and Somerset and took them into Barbados, where the arrived on 3 March. Readily accessible records make no mention of the disposition of the slaves on Betsey

Fate
Betsy, Fleck, master, was reported in February 1807 to have wrecked near Londonderry while on a voyage from the West Indies to the Clyde.

Citations

1801 ships
Age of Sail merchant ships of England
London slave ships
Captured ships
Maritime incidents in 1807